In music, Op. 120 stands for Opus number 120. Compositions that are assigned this number include:

 Berio – Op. 120, No. 1
 Brahms – Clarinet Sonatas
 Diabelli – Diabelli Variations
 Fauré – Piano Trio
 Ries – Piano Concerto No. 5
 Schumann – Symphony No. 4